Eika may refer to the following:

Eika, Møre og Romsdal, an island in Ulstein municipality, Møre og Romsdal, Norway
Hallvard Eika, a Norwegian politician
Sverre Eika, a Norwegian footballer
Eika (company), a subsidiary of the Mondragon Corporation in Spain
Eika Gruppen, a Norwegian banking alliance